Kamenka is a rural locality (a settlement) in Chushevitskoye Rural Settlement, Verkhovazhsky District, Vologda Oblast, Russia. The population was 560 as of 2002. There are 8 streets.

Geography 
Kamenka is located 49 km southwest of Verkhovazhye (the district's administrative centre) by road. Podsosenye is the nearest rural locality.

References 

Rural localities in Verkhovazhsky District